Anaphalis elegans is a species of flowering plants within the family Asteraceae. It is found in China (W Sichuan (Dêgê) and NW Yunnan (Zhongdian)).

References

External links 

 Anaphalis elegans at eflora (flora of China)

elegans
Plants described in 1966
Flora of Sichuan
Flora of Yunnan